Ronald or Ron Roberts may refer to:

 Ronald Roberts (basketball) (born 1991), American-Dominican basketball player
 Ronald Roberts (swimmer) (1922–2012), British swimmer
 Ronald Suresh Roberts (born 1968), British West Indian biographer, lawyer and writer
 Ronald Roberts (ice hockey executive) (1925–2012), Canadian ice hockey executive
Ronald Roberts (veterinarian) (born 1941), Scottish veterinary pathologist
 Ron Roberts (footballer) (born 1942), football winger
 Ron Roberts (rugby league) (1927–2003), Australian rugby league player
 Ron Roberts (politician) (born 1944), Australian politician
 Ron Roberts (American football) (born 1967), American football coach